Marius Müller (born 15 October 1990) is a German football midfielder

Müller started playing for the youth teams of SV Steinbach and Borussia Fulda. In 2009, he moved to Hünfelder SV who played in the Hessenliga. After one season, he moved to the second team of Eintracht Frankfurt, playing in the Regionalliga Süd. Only one year later, he transferred to the second team of city rivals FSV Frankfurt. In summer 2012, he joined SSV Jahn Regensburg who were newly promoted to the 2. Bundesliga. In the first half of the season he did not get any playing time for the first team and was loaned out for the rest of the season to SV Steinbach. After only one season, Regensburg was relegated to the 3. Liga and Müller made several appearances for the first team.

References

External links
 

1990 births
Living people
German footballers
Borussia Fulda players
Eintracht Frankfurt II players
SSV Jahn Regensburg players
3. Liga players
Association football midfielders
SSV Jahn Regensburg II players